Brian Hemphill is an American academic administrator, researcher, author and the current president of Old Dominion University, his third university presidency in a decade. Before taking the role at ODU, Hemphill was president of Radford University and West Virginia State University. On February 12, 2021, Dr. Hemphill was announced as the 9th president of Old Dominion University in Norfolk, Virginia. He had become  president of West Virginia State University in 2012 and of Radford in 2016.
Before the West Virginia position, he had been vice president for student affairs and enrollment management at Northern Illinois University, where he received several student and professional awards, and was praised for his work in the aftermath of a 2008 campus mass shooting. He later edited a book on campus violence as well as presenting papers on leadership and crisis management in higher education.

Education
In 1992, Hemphill received a B.A. in organizational communication from St. Augustine's University. In 1994, he earned an M.S. in journalism and mass communication from Iowa State University. In 1998, he earned a Ph.D. in higher education administration and policy studies at the University of Iowa.

External links
 West Virginia State announcement
 Radford University President's page
 Old Dominion University President-elect's page

Sources

Old Dominion University people
Presidents of Radford University
American educational theorists
Living people
Year of birth missing (living people)
Presidents of West Virginia State University
St. Augustine's University (North Carolina) alumni
Iowa State University alumni
University of Iowa alumni
American academic administrators
African-American academics